The SVG Party (TSVGP) is a  political party in Saint Vincent and the Grenadines. The SVG Party was founded in August 2018 by Derek Richards-Jones. The party aims to pull the country together and put the sole interest of the country first regardless of political persuasions.

Footnotes

2018 establishments in North America
Politics of Saint Vincent and the Grenadines
Political parties in Saint Vincent and the Grenadines
Republicanism in Saint Vincent and the Grenadines
Political parties established in 2018